Uruguay competed at the 2004 Summer Olympics in Athens, Greece, from 13 to 29 August 2004. This was the nation's eighteenth appearance at the Olympics, except the 1980 Summer Olympics in Moscow, because of its full support to the United States boycott.

The Uruguayan Olympic Committee (COU) sent a total of 15 athletes to the Games, 13 men and 2 women, to compete in 6 different sports. Four athletes from the Uruguayan team had previously competed in Sydney, including track cyclist Milton Wynants, who won the bronze in the men's points race, and backstroke swimmer Serrana Fernández, who later carried the nation's flag in the opening ceremony. 

Following Wynants' blistering finish in men's track cycling from Sydney four years earlier, Uruguay, however, failed to win a single Olympic medal in Athens.

Athletics

Uruguayan athletes have so far achieved qualifying standards in the following athletics events (up to a maximum of 3 athletes in each event at the 'A' Standard, and 1 at the 'B' Standard).

Men

Women

Canoeing

Sprint

Qualification Legend: Q = Qualify to final; q = Qualify to semifinal

Cycling

Track
Omnium

Rowing

Uruguayan rowers qualified the following boats:

Men

Qualification Legend: FA=Final A (medal); FB=Final B (non-medal); FC=Final C (non-medal); FD=Final D (non-medal); FE=Final E (non-medal); FF=Final F (non-medal); SA/B=Semifinals A/B; SC/D=Semifinals C/D; SE/F=Semifinals E/F; R=Repechage

Sailing

Uruguayan sailors have qualified one boat for each of the following events.

Men

Open

M = Medal race; OCS = On course side of the starting line; DSQ = Disqualified; DNF = Did not finish; DNS= Did not start; RDG = Redress given

Swimming

Uruguayan swimmers earned qualifying standards in the following events (up to a maximum of 2 swimmers in each event at the A-standard time, and 1 at the B-standard time):

Men

Women

See also
 Uruguay at the 2003 Pan American Games
 Uruguay at the 2004 Summer Paralympics

References

External links
Official Report of the XXVIII Olympiad
Uruguayan Olympic Committee 

Nations at the 2004 Summer Olympics
2004 Summer Olympics
Summer Olympics